Monte Clifton Berry (born August 23, 1962, in Joplin, Missouri) is an American retired jockey who successfully competed in American Quarter Horse racing and in Thoroughbred racing. On Dec. 10, 2010, he became one of only four jockeys in U.S. racing history to win seven races on a single racecard and in his case it was all the races run. He retired at the end of 2015 as the winningest jockey in the history of Remington Park and  Lone Star Park.

References

1962 births
Living people
American jockeys
Sportspeople from Joplin, Missouri